The Old Jail is an historic building located in Muscatine, Iowa, United States.  The building was built in 1857 across the street from the Muscatine County Courthouse.  It replaced the original county jail that had been built in 1839.  It was replaced by the county in 1907.  The building was listed on the National Register of Historic Places in 1974.

References

Government buildings completed in 1857
Infrastructure completed in 1857
National Register of Historic Places in Muscatine County, Iowa
Buildings and structures in Muscatine, Iowa
Jails on the National Register of Historic Places in Iowa
Jails in Iowa
1857 establishments in Iowa